Fudodani Dam  is a gravity dam located in Mie Prefecture in Japan. The dam is used for power production. The catchment area of the dam is 28.6 km2. The dam impounds about 2  ha of land when full and can store 71 thousand cubic meters of water. The construction of the dam was started on 1957 and completed in 1961.

See also
List of dams in Japan

References

Dams in Mie Prefecture